Anisentomon is a genus of proturans in the family Eosentomidae.

Species
 Anisentomon chinensis (Yin, 1965)
 Anisentomon heterochaitum Yin, 1977
 Anisentomon magnispinosum (Yin, 1965)
 Anisentomon quadrisetum Zhang & Yin, 1981

References

Protura